Alba Arnova (15 March 1930 – 11 March 2018) was an Italian-Argentine ballerina and film actress.

Life and career 
Born in Buenos Aires as Alba Fossati, daughter of two Italian emigrants, Arnova studied piano at the Conservatory and enrolled in the university at the medical faculty.  She became the principal classical dancer of the Teatro Colón in Buenos Aires and changed her surname first to Ars Nova and then to Arnova.  She left Argentina in 1948, for a six months stage tour, and eventually remained in Rome, where she worked first in theater as a classical dancer and as a revue and avanspettacolo soubrette. She began acting in films in 1949, though usually in minor roles. 

In 1956 Arnova created a controversy when she appeared on the RAI television variety show La piazzetta wearing a tight leotard that made her appear semi-nude because of the lighting effects and the black-and-white system. The show was suspended and she was subsequently fired and banned from Italian television. She subsequently chose to leave showbusiness. 

Arnova was married to composer and conductor Gianni Ferrio.

Filmography 
 Al diavolo la celebrità, Regie: Mario Monicelli and Steno (1949)
 La strada buia, Regie: Sidney Salkow and Marino Girolami (1950)
 La cintura di castità, Regie: Camillo Mastrocinque (1950)
 Miracle in Milan, Regie: Vittorio De Sica (1950)
 Totò Tarzan, Regie: Mario Mattoli (1951)
 Arrivano i nostri, Regie: Mario Mattoli (1951)
 O.K. Nerone, Regie: Mario Soldati (1951)
 Altri tempi, Regie: Alessandro Blasetti (1952)
 Finalmente libero, Regie: Mario Amendola (1953)
  Loving You Is My Sin, Regie: Sergio Grieco (1953)
 Aida, Regie: Clemente Fracassi (1953)
 My Life Is Yours, Regie: Giuseppe Masini (1953)
 La Gioconda, Regie: Giacinto Solito (1953)
 Amori di mezzo secolo, Regie: Mario Chiari (1954)
 Cento anni d'amore, Regie: Lionello De Felice (1954)
 Red and Black, Regie: Domenico Paolella (1954)
 Farewell, My Beautiful Lady, Regie: Fernando Cerchio (1954)
 The Lady of the Camellias, Regie: Raymond Bernard (1954)
 Una donna prega, Regie: Anton Giulio Majano (1954)
 Tempi nostri, Regie: Alessandro Blasetti (1954)
 L'amante di Paride, Regie: Marc Allègret (1954)
 Figaro, barbiere di Siviglia, Regie: Camillo Mastrocinque (1955)
 I pinguini ci guardano, Regie: Guido Leoni (1955)
 Il motivo in maschera, Regie: Stefano Canzio (1955)
 La ribalta dei sogni, Regie: Ernesto Araciba (1955) 
  Una viuda difícil ' ' Regie Fernando Alaya (1957)
 Gerusalemme liberata, Regie: Carlo Ludovico Bragaglia (1957)
 Europa di notte'', Regie: Alessandro Blasetti (1959)

References

External links

1930 births
2018 deaths
Actresses from Buenos Aires
Argentine emigrants to Italy
Argentine film actresses
Argentine people of Italian descent
Italian ballerinas
Italian film actresses